Korenica is a village in Lika, Croatia, located in the municipality of Plitvička Jezera, on the D1 road between Plitvice and Udbina. According to 2011 census it has 1,766 residents. It is the seat of the Plitvička Jezera Municipality.

In SFR Yugoslavia it was named Titova Korenica after Yugoslav leader Josip Broz Tito. The population consists of local ethnic Croats and Serbs, and there are also Croats from Bosnia who moved to Croatia after the Croatian War for Independence.

Korenica has one elementary school and one high school.

History
The 1712 census of Lika and Krbava records that 119 Vlach (i.e. Serb Orthodox Christian) families live in Korenica.
Until 1918, Korenica was part of the Austrian monarchy (Kingdom of Croatia-Slavonia, Lika-Krbava County) after the compromise of 1867), in the Croatian Military Frontier, administered by the Kommando Ottotschaner Regiment  N°II before 1881. A post-office was opened in 1862.

Demographics

Census 1991:

Serbs	1.519 /	 88,51 %
Yugoslavs  84 /	4,89 %
Croats	49 /	2,85 %
Albanians 4 /	0,23 %
Muslims  3 /	0,17 %
Italians 2 /	0,11 %
Hungarians 2 /	0,11 %
Slovenians 1 /	0,05 %
Montenegrins 1 /	0,05 %
undeclared 15 /	0,87 %
unknown	36 /	2,09 %

NOTE: Population figures for the period 1857–1880 also include population figures for the following settlements: Drakulić Rijeka, Gradina Korenička, Homoljac, Jasikovac, Kalebovac, Kompolje Koreničko, Mihaljevac, Oravac, Ponor Korenički, Šeganovac, Vranovača and Vrpile.

Sights

Catholic church st George
 Site of the Monument to the fallen partisan soldiers and civilian victims of fascism during the National Liberation War (WWII) from the Lika region, in Bijeli Potoci (destroyed around 2008)
 Ruins of the Serbian Orthodox Church of the Holy Archangels Michael and Gabriel, destroyed in 1943

See also
 Lika
Plitvice Lakes National Park
Plitvička Jezera

References

Populated places in Lika-Senj County